Babaköy can refer to the following villages in Turkey:

 Babaköy, Bigadiç
 Babaköy, Susurluk